Marromeu is a town in central Mozambique on the south side of the Zambezi River.

Transport 

It is served by a station on a branch off the central line of Mozambique Railways.

See also 

 Railway stations in Mozambique
 Transport in Mozambique

References 

Populated places in Sofala Province